Paula Dranisinukula  (born 23 Sep 1989) is a forward in the Fiji national rugby sevens team and a soldier in the Republic of Fiji Military Forces.  Dranisinukula made his debut for the Fiji national rugby sevens team in the 2017 Paris Sevens competition. Dranisinukula's favourite quotation is the Bible verse, Philipians 4:13 "I can do all things through Christ who strengthens me."

References

External links 
 

1989 births
Living people
Fiji national rugby union team
Commonwealth Games medallists in rugby sevens
Commonwealth Games silver medallists for Fiji
Rugby sevens players at the 2018 Commonwealth Games
Medallists at the 2018 Commonwealth Games